Output compare is the ability to trigger an output based on a timestamp in memory, without interrupting the execution of code by a processor or microcontroller. This is a functionality provided by many embedded systems.

The corresponding ability to record a timestamp in memory when an input occurs is called input capture. 

Embedded systems

 Microchip Documentation on Output Compare: DS39706A-page 16-1 - Section 16. Output Compare http://ww1.microchip.com/downloads/en/DeviceDoc/39706a.pdf